Orr or ORR may also refer to:

Acronyms
 Office of Rail and Road, a regulatory body in the United Kingdom
 Office of Refugee Resettlement, a program of the US Administration for Children and Families
 Oxygen reduction reaction, a type of chemical reaction
 Outer Ring Road (disambiguation), a series of roads in various places
 Operational Readiness Review (ORR), used by the US government
 ORR, objective response rate, or overall response rate, one of the parameters determined during clinical trials for pharmaceutical products

Places
 Orr, Kentucky, United States, an unincorporated community
 Orr, Minnesota, United States, a small city
 Orr, West Virginia, United States, an unincorporated community
 Orr, a district of Pulheim, Germany
 Orr Glacier, Victoria Land, Antarctica
 Orr Island, Marie Byrd Land, Antarctica
 Orr Peak, Ross Dependency, Antarctica
 Urr Water, Scotland, United Kingdom, archaically known as the River Orr
 Orr Formation, a geologic formation in Utah, United States

People
Orr (surname), including a list of people with this name
Orr Barouch (born 1991), Israeli footballer

Fictional characters
 Orr (Catch-22), a fictional character in the novel Catch-22 and the film adaptation
 George Orr, protagonist of the science-fiction novel The Lathe of Heaven by Ursula K. Le Guin and two film adaptations

Other uses
 Orr Academy High School, a public high school in Chicago, Illinois, United States
 Orr School, Texarkana, Arkansas, United States, on the National Register of Historic Places
 Yorketown Airport, IATA airport code "ORR"

See also
 Ore (disambiguation)
 Orr-Ewing Baronets
 Orr's Island, Maine, United States